Talma Hendler (born July 9, 1955) is a psychiatrist and researcher in neuroscience and one of the pioneers in the field of functional imaging of the brain in Israel. Her research focuses on understanding emotion, particularly in the context of human interactions with each other and when facing distressing life events. Hendler has published over 200 articles.

Hendler is the director of the Center for Brain Functions at the Tel Aviv Sourasky Medical Center and a professor of psychiatry and psychology at Tel Aviv University, School of Psychological Sciences and the Department of Physiology, and the Beit Sami Segol for Neuroscience. She is also the founding director of the Sagol Brain Institute in Tel Aviv.

Biography 
Hendler received her bachelor's degree in science from Hebrew University of Jerusalem in 1976. She received her medical degree from Tel Aviv University and doctorate from Stony Brook University in New York State in the field of psychobiology. When she returned to Israel, she completed her psychiatry residency at Sheba Medical Center. She then joined the Tel Aviv Sourasky Medical Center and founded the human neuroimaging research facility in Israel, the Sagol Brain Institute.

Hendler joined Tel Aviv University as a senior faculty member of their School of Psychology in 2005. 

Hendler was married to the winner of the Israel Prize for Cinema Judd Ne'eman until his death in 2021. They have two daughters, including , a singer and harp player.

Research 
Hendler's cumulative work in affective neuroscience has laid the foundation for the utilization of imaging technologies for developing therapeutics for mental suffering. The studies are conducted in collaboration with other research laboratories in Israel and around the world.

Hendler's research deals, among other things, with brain imaging in the field of neuropsychiatry and an attempt to characterize vulnerability or resistance to psychiatric disorders. Some of her research interests include: the cause and consequence of traumatic stress, longitudinal biomarkers of trauma induced psychopathology, anger in inter-personal context, neurobehavioral indications for ‘wanting’ and ‘liking’ in goal directed behavior, dynamic aspects of emotional experience induced by film clips and music excerpts and neural mechanism of emotion regulation. The research group she leads specializes in a wide range of advanced imaging methods which, in combination with physiological and behavioral data, focuses on the study of emotional and perceptual processing in the healthy and pathological brain. 

Hendler and her team studied patients with post-traumatic stress disorder from battles. In the study, brain responses to images with an emotionally traumatic charge, such as images from a battlefield, were examined. Hendler and her colleagues found that the patients' brains responded even when the image shown to the patients was so blurry that they claimed they could not distinguish the image. Despite this claim, the subjects' visual cortex - an area associated with perception rather than emotions - responded strongly to the images. This study highlighted the effect of emotions on memory.

Research
Hendler's laboratory was among the first in Israel to use functional magnetic resonance imaging (fMRI) and later combined imaging of fMRI with electroencephalography. 

Her lab at the Sagol Brain Institute pioneered the development of a new real-time imaging approach for the non-invasive identification of "neural finger-prints", that can reliably depict deep limbic areas through trans-modality learning computation (e.g. from fMRI to EEG). This novel method enables accessible bed-side Brain Computer Interface procedures aimed to alleviate and/or prevent stress related psychopathologies. 

Recently, the laboratory has been developing new imaging methods for monitoring and changing brain activity from deep areas in order to develop treatment tools guided by advanced imaging in real time (Neurofeedback).

References

1955 births
Living people
Israeli psychiatrists
Women psychiatrists
20th-century Israeli scientists
20th-century Israeli women scientists
21st-century Israeli scientists
21st-century Israeli women scientists
Hebrew University of Jerusalem alumni
Stony Brook University alumni
Academic staff of Tel Aviv University